Arhopala silhetensis, the Sylhet oakblue, (sometimes placed in Amblypodia) is a small butterfly found in India that belongs to the lycaenids or blues family. The species was first described by William Chapman Hewitson in 1862.

Range
The butterfly occurs in India from Sikkim onto north Myanmar, and, from Karens to south Myanmar.

Status
The species is considered rare.

See also
Lycaenidae
List of butterflies of India (Lycaenidae)

Cited references

References

External links
 With images.

Arhopala
Butterflies of Asia
Butterflies described in 1862
Taxa named by William Chapman Hewitson